The following are the statistics of the Turkish First Football League in season 1983/1984.

Overview
Eighteen teams participated, and Trabzonspor won the championship. Trabzonspor have not won a league title until the 2021–22 season. This season was the first season in which no İzmir team took part in the league.

League table

Results

References

Turkey - List of final tables (RSSSF)

Süper Lig seasons
1983–84 in Turkish football
Turkey